Tricoelodus is an extinct genus of adianthid litopterns that lived during the Late Oligocene in what is now  Argentina and Bolivia. Fossils of this genus have been found in the Sarmiento Formation of Argentina and the Salla Formation of Bolivia.

Naming and classification 
Tricoelodus was named by Ameghino in 1897.

Tricoelodus was first assigned to Mesorhinidae by Ameghino in 1897. It was then assigned to Adianthinae by Cifelli & Soria in 1983; and to Adianthidae by Cifelli in 1983 and by Carroll in 1988.

References 

Litopterns
Prehistoric placental genera
Oligocene mammals of South America
Paleogene Argentina
Paleogene Bolivia
Fossils of Argentina
Fossils of Bolivia
Deseadan
Fossil taxa described in 1897
Taxa named by Florentino Ameghino
Golfo San Jorge Basin
Sarmiento Formation